In chess, the Maróczy Gambit, is an opening line in the Fantasy Variation of the Caro–Kann Defence in which White sacrifices a pawn for a large lead in  and  chances. It begins with the moves

 1. e4 c6
 2. d4 d5
 3. f3 dxe4
 4. fxe4 e5
 5. Nf3 exd4
 6. Bc4

White offers a pawn, aiming to exert pressure on Black's king and f-pawn. Another possibility for White's 6th move is to recapture the lost pawn with 6.Qxd4. However, this allows Black to trade queens and dissolve White's immediate  chances. 6.Bc4 is therefore evaluated by engines as the strongest move in this position.

The Encyclopaedia of Chess Openings classifies the Maróczy Gambit under code B12.

History 
The opening takes its name from Hungarian Grandmaster Geza Maróczy, who first played it in London in 1899. The first recorded game Maróczy used it in was against Francis J. Lee, and it ended in a draw. Soon after, he used the same gambit against Wilhelm Cohn and secured a victory.

The Maróczy Gambit reached its peak popularity in the 1930's, but has seen a resurgence of popularity in the 21st century. Nonetheless, it remains a relatively rare variation of the Caro-Kann Defence.

Analysis 
1.e4 c6 2.d4 d5 3.f3 dxe4 4.fxe4 e5 5.Nf3 exd4 6.Bc4

 GM Nigel Davies notes that 3...dxe4 4.fxe4 e5 is the sharpest line of the Fantasy Variation. "This line has quite a dubious reputation since Black has suffered many quick losses. Nevertheless it's perfectly playable for Black provided they know theory." However, following 5.Nf3 with 5...exd4?! is a mistake after which White's initiative grows rapidly. "This move has been considered insufficient since the end of the 19th century, nevertheless [there are] hundreds of recent games where Black committed this mistake."

 By following this with 6.Bc4 (the Maróczy Gambit) instead of recapturing the d-pawn, White begins to exert pressure on Black's king and f-pawn. The strongest and most popular responses to the Maróczy Gambit by Black are 6...Nf6 7.O-O Nbd7, 7...Be7, 7...Bc5, and 6...Be6 7.Bxe6 fxe6 8. O-O. Natural looking responses which can be easily punished by White in order to attain winning positions are 6...Bg4, 6...Bb4+, and 6...c5.

Stronger Responses 

The strongest responses for Black either aim to shelter the king as quickly as possible, or seek to trade off/neutralize the threat of White's light square bishop.

6...Nf6 7.O-O Nbd7 (diagram)

 This is likely the strongest reply for Black, as 6...Nf6 develops a piece while protecting the f-pawn from discoveries by the rook, should the knight on f3 move after 7.O-O is played. 7...Nbd7 is very solid, and prevents 8.Ng5 from being played, since 8...Ne5 would protect the f-pawn.

7...Be7 and 7...Bc5

These dark square bishop moves are both viable, and can even be played before Nf6. However, these lines allow White to maintain an advantage with 8. Ng5! which preserves White's ability to continue the attack.

6...Be6 7. Bxe6 fxe6 8. O-O

 This is just as tenable for Black, since trading off the light square bishops seriously hinders White's attack. Nonetheless, Black remains at a noticeable positional disadvantage and is behind in development. This line was first played between Savielly Tartakower and Dawid Przepiórka in Budapest in 1929, and resulted in a victory for Tartakower who played as White.

Weaker Responses 
The weakest responses for Black either allow traps with Bxf7! (a main motif of the Maróczy Gambit), or neglect development to a fatal extent.

6...Bg4??This move looks good at first glance, but is easily refuted by 7. Bxf7+!, since after 7...Kxf7 8. Ne5+ (diagram), White easily wins the Bishop on g4, and has dragged Black's king out into the open.6...Bb4+?

 Bb4+ is a wasted move, because after 7.c3, Black can not recapture with 7...dxc3. As in the Bg4?? line, this leads to 8.Bxf7! This bishop can not be taken by the king without hanging the queen on d8. Therefore, Black's only way to proceed after 6...Bb4+ 7.c3 is with 7...Ba5.

6...c5?This move aims to protect the d-pawn, and doesn't fall into any immediate Bxf7 traps. However, after White castles with 7.O-O, it becomes clear that Black has a losing position in the long-term.

See also 

 List of chess openings
 List of chess openings named after people

Notes

References 

Bibliography

 
 

Chess openings